The 2000 congressional elections in Michigan was held on November 7, 2000 to determine who would represent the state of Michigan in the United States House of Representatives. Michigan had sixteen seats in the House, apportioned according to the 1990 United States Census. Representatives are elected for two-year terms.

Overview

References

2000 Michigan elections
2000
Michigan